Handsome Boy is the 14th studio album by a Japanese singer-songwriter Yōsui Inoue, released in 1990.

The album contains the songs that were already known through the commercial tie-in with television programs or advertisements. Like "Gallery" which was recorded by Yoko Oginome and released as a single in June 1990, some of the materials were previously interpreted by other performers.

Prior to the album, three songs were released as a single; "Yume Ne Mi", "Saigo no News", and "Shounen Jidai" which was co-written by Natsumi Hirai and has been one of his most well-known songs throughout Inoue's longtime career. It was initially featured on the theme song for an award-winning film adaptation of Fujiko Fujio (A)'s manga Childhood Days (based on Hyouzou Kashiwabara's novel Nagai Michi). The song was gradually recognized through the TV ad of Sony Handycam which was aired during the following year. "Shounen Jidai" became his biggest hit single, peaking at No. 4 on the Japanese chart and selling more than 850,000 copies in total. In 1997, 3-inch CD single of the song was certified quadruple platinum by the Recording Industry Association of Japan, for shipments of over 1 million copies.

Led by the success of a single "Shounen Jidai", the album Handsome Boy itself also gained favorable reaction, peaking at No. 2 on the Japanese Oricon chart and entering top-100 for over 10 months with sales of about 640,000 copies.

Track listing
All songs written and composed by Yōsui Inoue, unless otherwise noted
"Pi Po Pa" – 3:55
"" – 3:35
"" (Inoue, Yūji Kawashima) – 3:51
"" – 3:55
"" – 5:07
"" (Inoue, Natsumi Hirai) – 3:21
"" – 3:21
"Tokyo" (Inoue, Hirai) – 3:56
"" – 5:03
"" (Inoue, Hirai) – 6:07
"" (Inoue, Kawashima) – 4:22

Personnel
Yōsui Inoue – Vocals, acoustic guitar
Hiromi Yasuda – Acoustic guitar
Kenji Ōmura – Electric guitar
Tomotaka Imamichi – Electric guitar
Jun Sumida – Electric guitar
Masaki Matsubara – Electric guitar
Masayoshi Furukawa – Gut-string guitar
Hirokazu Ogura – Gut-string guitar
Masami Satou – Gut-string guitar
Tsugutoshi Goto – Bass guitar
Motofumi Hagiwara – Bass guitar
Chiharu Mikuzuki – Bass guitar
Vagabond Suzuki – Bass guitar
Haruomi Hosono – Bass guitar, synthesizer, percussion
Tadashi Nanba – Synthesizer
Akira Inoue – Synthesizer
Miharu Koshi – Synthesizer
Akira Senju – Synthesizer
Shinji Kawahara – Piano
Takao Kisugi – Piano
Yasuharu Nakanishi – Piano
Yūji Kawashima – Synthesizer, computer programming
Takeshi Fujii – Computer programming
Hiroaki Sugawara – Computer programming
Nobuo Tsuji – Computer programming
Ma*to – Computer programming
Yasuo Kimoto – Computer programming
Motoya Hamaguchi – Percussion
Eiji Narushima – Percussion
Masato Hashida – Percussion
Makoto Kimura – Percussion
Hinotamao – Percussion
Hideo Yamaki – Drums
Eiji Shimamura – Drums
Yutaka Odawara – Drums
Junichi Kazezaki – Brasswinds
Shin Kazuhara – Brasswinds
Kenichirou Hayashi – Brasswinds
Masahiro Kobayashi – Brasswinds
Kenji Nakazawa – Brasswinds
Kenji Nishiyama – Brasswinds
Taro Kiyooka – Brasswinds
Sumiyo Okada – Brasswinds
Watanabe Katsu – Brasswinds
Teiko Haruna – Woodwinds
Mitsuru Souma – Woodwinds
Ryūji Hoshikawa – Woodwinds
Tadashi Togame – Woodwinds
Masakazu Ishibashi – Woodwinds
Toshitsugu Inoue – Woodwinds
Jake H. Conception – Woodwinds
Hirofumi Kinjou – Woodwinds
Masaki Takano – Woodwinds
Hiroyuki Ichihara – Woodwinds
Hidefumi Toki – Woodwinds
Aska Kaneko Strings – Strings
Akiko Yano – Chorus
Minako Yoshida – Chorus
Seri Ishikawa – Chorus

Chart positions

Album

Singles

Release history

References

1990 albums
Yōsui Inoue albums